Middlesbrough Youth Theatres (MYT) is an umbrella company consisting of Middlesbrough Junior Theatre, earlier known as MLT Juniors (aged 11–16), together with a 'Kidstage' group of 7- to 11-year-olds, and an older 'Youth Theatre' of 11- to 18-year-olds. The largest section of the company is the Juniors, a group originally created in 1956.

The company performs in Middlesbrough Theatre, and many of its former members continue to work in drama and the performing arts. The group is a member of the National Association of Youth Theatres (NAYT). The company has also taken part in the Edinburgh Fringe, and is a regular at the Middlesbrough Youth Drama Festival. Several full-length musicals have been written especially for the company and all have been performed on the professional stage at the Middlesbrough Theatre. The current Artistic Director of MYT is Wendy Lowe.

Show history 

 2022 - ‘Cats’
 2022- ‘Alice In Wonderland’ Jr 
 2022 - ‘Bugsy Malone’

The Group 

The longest running section of the group itself was its "Juniors"; MLT Juniors being the group's official name until 2002. The "Juniors" typically has a membership of around 100, ageing from around 13 to 16 (although this age limit often changed). The older "Youth" group has around twenty members. The "Kidstage" theatre group brought about a new beginning for MLT Ltd as it took on a separate group of up to 30 pre-secondary school children.

The company is managed by 'leaders', consisting of both professional and amateur actors, dancers and singers. As a company, there are also directors, an administrator and a treasurer. These members of staff are often the directors, musical directors or backstage crew of the productions. The backstage, costuming and rehearsal crew itself is usually made up of volunteers, with professional lighting and sound crews, and occasionally an orchestra, being the only part of each production that does not come from within the 'group'.

Some limited special effects were made use of during MLTJ performances, including notably splurge guns during 'Bugsy Malone', indoor fireworks during 'Santa Claus: The Musical' and a flying sequence during 'Peter Pan'.

The Leaders 

Here is a partial list of some of the leaders who have worked with Middlesbrough Youth Theatre;
* Jane Lester-Bourne 
 Georgie Sanderson
 Jean Scarlet Carr 
 Natalie O'Brian 
 Vicki Cox 
 Paul Mason
 Tim Jasper
 David Tuffnell 
 Sam Readman 
 Jessica Mouland 
 Lucy Patchett

Rehearsals & Performances 

The group rehearses in several venues in Middlesbrough, north-east England, with productions staged in the town's Middlesbrough Theatre. The theatre itself seats 484 people, and was the first theatre to be built in Britain after World War II. The company now rehearse at Toft House Middlesbrough but use The Scout Hut ( Tollesby Road ) for weekly workshops.

Middlesbrough Little Theatre Ltd. 

Middlesbrough Youth Theatre was affiliated with MLT Ltd., which was born in 1930, and whose productions, although sometimes directed by professionals, were performed almost always by amateurs. Their first play, "To What Red Hell", by Percy Robinson, was presented in November 1930 in the Church Hall of St. John's. The company occupied this stage for twenty-seven years, until in 1945 a new theatre was proposed using money from the Building Fund. Complications meant that, as well as the cost rising to three times the original estimate, the Middlesbrough Theatre did not open until 1957.

The theatre was opened by Sir John Gielgud, and its opening production was a lavish presentation of 'Caesar and Cleopatra'. The Theatre was handed over to the local council in 1972 due to rising maintenance costs, but MLT Ltd, the resident amateur company, still resides there, staging around 2-4 shows each year.

Previous Members 

Previous members of MYT have gone onto careers in the performing arts. The following internet links are to other websites concerning some of these people.

 Mark Benton, Actor
 Peter Gordon, Actor
 Lisa Newton, Costume Designer
 Jessica Robinson, Singer/Actress
 Natasha Ferguson, Singer/Actress - UK & Ireland Tour of Wicked (1st Cover 'Nessa Rose') 
 Matthew Dale, Singer/Actor - UK & Ireland Tour of Billy Elliot (1st Cover 'Tony')

References

External links 
 

Clubs and societies in England
Middlesbrough
Youth organisations based in the United Kingdom
Youth theatre companies
Organisations based in North Yorkshire
Culture in North Yorkshire